Sanfutie is a procedure in traditional Chinese medicine in which medicated patches are placed on various acupuncture points on the body. As  is the hottest period on the Chinese calendar, it is considered a particularly suitable time for treating illnesses.

Typically, four of these credit-card-sized patches are applied to different locations on the back at the same time, and are kept there for several minutes (depends on the component of the patches).

See Also 
 Allergic rhinitis : one of winter disease to be treated by Sanfutie

External links 
 今起三伏天灸 冬病夏治，《頭條日報》，2010年7月19日
  
 冬病夏治三伏贴时间

Traditional Chinese medicine